Selenga (Selenge) is a rural locality (a selo) in Tarbagataysky District, Republic of Buryatia, Russia. The population was 99 as of 2010. There are 4 streets.

Geography 
Selenga is located 19 km north of Tarbagatay (the district's administrative centre) by road. Solontsy is the nearest rural locality.

References 

Rural localities in Tarbagataysky District